Gene Ready (May 27, 1941 – December 12, 2015) was an American former politician in the state of Florida.

Ready was born in Lakeland, Florida. He attended Florida State University and earned a Bachelor of Science degree in 1964. He served as a Democrat in the Florida House of Representatives from 1977 to 1982, representing the 51st district, and from 1983 to 1984, this time representing the 44th district. Ready died of cancer on December 12, 2015, in Lakeland, Florida.

References

1941 births
2015 deaths
People from Lakeland, Florida
Florida State University alumni
Businesspeople from Florida
Democratic Party members of the Florida House of Representatives
Deaths from cancer in Florida
20th-century American businesspeople